The 1981–82 NBA season was the Spurs' sixth season in the NBA and 15th season as a franchise.
George Gervin was the winner of a fourth scoring title in five years with 32.3 points per game. The Spurs won their second straight division title with a record of 48-34. In the playoffs the Spurs beat the Seattle SuperSonics in 5 games. In the Western Finals, the Spurs would be swept in 4 straight by the Los Angeles Lakers. The Spurs had the third best team offensive rating in the NBA.

Draft picks

Roster

Regular season

Season Standings

Record vs. opponents

Game log

Regular season

|- align="center" bgcolor="#ccffcc"
| 1
| October 30
| @ Kansas City
| W 113–102
|
|
|
| Kemper Arena
| 1–0
|- align="center" bgcolor="#ccffcc"
| 2
| October 31
| Denver
| W 145–120
|
|
|
| HemisFair Arena
| 2–0

|- align="center" bgcolor="#ffcccc"
| 3
| November 3
| @ Phoenix
| L 88–111
|
|
|
| Arizona Veterans Memorial Coliseum
| 2–1
|- align="center" bgcolor="#ccffcc"
| 4
| November 4
| Cleveland
| W 128–102
|
|
|
| HemisFair Arena
| 3–1
|- align="center" bgcolor="#ccffcc"
| 5
| November 7
| New York
| W 103–96
|
|
|
| HemisFair Arena
| 4–1
|- align="center" bgcolor="#ccffcc"
| 6
| November 10
| Los Angeles
| W 128–102
|
|
|
| HemisFair Arena
| 5–1
|- align="center" bgcolor="#ccffcc"
| 7
| November 13
| @ Seattle
| W 119–112
|
|
|
| Kingdome
| 6–1
|- align="center" bgcolor="#ccffcc"
| 8
| November 15
| @ Portland
| W 110–105
|
|
|
| Memorial Coliseum
| 7–1
|- align="center" bgcolor="#ccffcc"
| 9
| November 17
| @ Dallas
| W 112–105
|
|
|
| Reunion Arena
| 8–1
|- align="center" bgcolor="#ccffcc"
| 10
| November 18
| Seattle
| W 111–93
|
|
|
| HemisFair Arena
| 9–1
|- align="center" bgcolor="#ffcccc"
| 11
| November 20
| @ Los Angeles
| L 116–136
|
|
|
| The Forum
| 9–2
|- align="center" bgcolor="#ffcccc"
| 12
| November 21
| @ Golden State
| L 122–129
|
|
|
| Oakland–Alameda County Coliseum Arena
| 9–3
|- align="center" bgcolor="#ffcccc"
| 13
| November 25
| Los Angeles
| L 96–117
|
|
|
| HemisFair Arena
| 9–4
|- align="center" bgcolor="#ccffcc"
| 14
| November 27
| New Jersey
| W 114–86
|
|
|
| HemisFair Arena
| 10–4
|- align="center" bgcolor="#ffcccc"
| 15
| November 29
| @ Milwaukee
| L 89–105
|
|
|
| MECCA Arena
| 10–5

|- align="center" bgcolor="#ccffcc"
| 16
| December 1
| @ Washington
| W 110–99
|
|
|
| Capital Centre
| 11–5
|- align="center" bgcolor="#ccffcc"
| 17
| December 2
| @ Philadelphia
| W 106–101
|
|
|
| The Spectrum
| 12–5
|- align="center" bgcolor="#ccffcc"
| 18
| December 4
| Portland
| W 127–111
|
|
|
| HemisFair Arena
| 13–5
|- align="center" bgcolor="#ccffcc"
| 19
| December 9
| Seattle
| W 110–99
|
|
|
| HemisFair Arena
| 14–5
|- align="center" bgcolor="#ccffcc"
| 20
| December 11
| @ Dallas
| W 101–99
|
|
|
| Reunion Arena
| 15–5
|- align="center" bgcolor="#ccffcc"
| 21
| December 12
| Utah
| W 111–97
|
|
|
| HemisFair Arena
| 16–5
|- align="center" bgcolor="#ffcccc"
| 22
| December 15
| @ Utah
| L 103–108
|
|
|
| Salt Palace Acord Arena
| 16–6
|- align="center" bgcolor="#ffcccc"
| 23
| December 18
| Phoenix
| L 104–108
|
|
|
| HemisFair Arena
| 16–7
|- align="center" bgcolor="#ffcccc"
| 24
| December 19
| @ Denver
| L 125–138
|
|
|
| McNichols Sports Arena
| 16–8
|- align="center" bgcolor="#ccffcc"
| 25
| December 23
| @ San Diego
| W 114–109
|
|
|
| San Diego Sports Arena
| 17–8
|- align="center" bgcolor="#ffcccc"
| 26
| December 26
| Atlanta
| L 97–105
|
|
|
| HemisFair Arena
| 17–9
|- align="center" bgcolor="#ccffcc"
| 27
| December 29
| San Diego
| W 119–107
|
|
|
| HemisFair Arena
| 18–9
|- align="center" bgcolor="#ccffcc"
| 28
| December 30
| Houston
| W 109–104
|
|
|
| HemisFair Arena
| 19–9

|- align="center" bgcolor="#ccffcc"
| 29
| January 2
| Denver
| W 148–133
|
|
|
| HemisFair Arena
| 20–9
|- align="center" bgcolor="#ffcccc"
| 30
| January 5
| @ Portland
| L 110–115
|
|
|
| Memorial Coliseum
| 20–10
|- align="center" bgcolor="#ffcccc"
| 31
| January 6
| @ Utah
| L 115–130
|
|
|
| Salt Palace Acord Arena
| 20–11
|- align="center" bgcolor="#ccffcc"
| 32
| January 7
| @ Golden State
| W 123–112
|
|
|
| Oakland–Alameda County Coliseum Arena
| 21–11
|- align="center" bgcolor="#ccffcc"
| 33
| January 9
| Kansas City
| W 113–100
|
|
|
| HemisFair Arena
| 22–11
|- align="center" bgcolor="#ccffcc"
| 34
| January 12
| Dallas
| W 127–109
|
|
|
| HemisFair Arena
| 23–11
|- align="center" bgcolor="#ccffcc"
| 35
| January 15
| Houston
| W 128–90
|
|
|
| HemisFair Arena
| 24–11
|- align="center" bgcolor="#ffcccc"
| 36
| January 16
| @ Houston
| L 99–116
|
|
|
| The Summit
| 24–12
|- align="center" bgcolor="#ffcccc"
| 37
| January 19
| @ Phoenix
| L 96–108
|
|
|
| Arizona Veterans Memorial Coliseum
| 24–13
|- align="center" bgcolor="#ccffcc"
| 38
| January 21
| Utah
| W 123–104
|
|
|
| HemisFair Arena
| 25–13
|- align="center" bgcolor="#ccffcc"
| 39
| January 22
| @ Atlanta
| W 115–107
|
|
|
| The Omni
| 26–13
|- align="center" bgcolor="#ffcccc"
| 40
| January 23
| Indiana
| L 98–107
|
|
|
| HemisFair Arena
| 26–14
|- align="center" bgcolor="#ccffcc"
| 41
| January 26
| Philadelphia
| W 103–95
|
|
|
| HemisFair Arena
| 27–14
|- align="center" bgcolor="#ccffcc"
| 42
| January 28
| Kansas City
| W 126–115
|
|
|
| HemisFair Arena
| 28–14

|- align="center" bgcolor="#ccffcc"
| 43
| February 2
| Dallas
| W 103–98
|
|
|
| HemisFair Arena
| 28–15
|- align="center" bgcolor="#ccffcc"
| 44
| February 4
| Phoenix
| W 118–112
|
|
|
| HemisFair Arena
| 29–15
|- align="center" bgcolor="#ffcccc"
| 45
| February 5
| @ Kansas City
| L 102–109
|
|
|
| Kemper Arena
| 30–15
|- align="center" bgcolor="#ffcccc"
| 46
| February 7
| @ Golden State
| L 111–116
|
|
|
| Oakland–Alameda County Coliseum Arena
| 30–16
|- align="center" bgcolor="#ffcccc"
| 47
| February 9
| Washington
| L 110–112
|
|
|
| HemisFair Arena
| 30–17
|- align="center" bgcolor="#ccffcc"
| 48
| February 12
| @ Los Angeles
| W 100–94
|
|
|
| The Forum
| 31–17
|- align="center" bgcolor="#ccffcc"
| 49
| February 14
| Seattle
| W 114–94
|
|
|
| HemisFair Arena
| 32–17
|- align="center" bgcolor="#ccffcc"
| 50
| February 17
| Detroit
| W 126–112
|
|
|
| HemisFair Arena
| 33–17
|- align="center" bgcolor="#ccffcc"
| 51
| February 19
| @ Denver
| W 126–121
|
|
|
| McNichols Sports Arena
| 34–17
|- align="center" bgcolor="#ffcccc"
| 52
| February 20
| San Diego
| L 101–118
|
|
|
| HemisFair Arena
| 34–18
|- align="center" bgcolor="#ccffcc"
| 53
| February 23
| Golden State
| W 143–123
|
|
|
| HemisFair Arena
| 35–18
|- align="center" bgcolor="#ccffcc"
| 54
| February 25
| @ Detroit
| W 119–116
|
|
|
| Pontiac Silverdome
| 36–18
|- align="center" bgcolor="#ffcccc"
| 55
| February 26
| @ Indiana
| L 100–108
|
|
|
| Market Square Arena
| 36–19
|- align="center" bgcolor="#ccffcc"
| 56
| February 28
| @ Chicago
| L 104–118
|
|
|
| Chicago Stadium
| 36–20

|- align="center" bgcolor="#ccffcc"
| 57
| March 2
| @ Houston
| W 119–117
|
|
|
| The Summit
| 37–20
|- align="center" bgcolor="#ffcccc"
| 58
| March 4
| Boston
| L 101–110
|
|
|
| HemisFair Arena
| 37–21
|- align="center" bgcolor="#ccffcc"
| 59
| March 6
| Milwaukee
| W 171–166 (3OT)
|
|
|
| HemisFair Arena
| 38–21
|- align="center" bgcolor="#ffcccc"
| 60
| March 8
| Dallas
| L 113–121
|
|
|
| HemisFair Arena
| 38–22
|- align="center" bgcolor="#ffcccc"
| 61
| March 9
| @ San Diego
| L 127–138
|
|
|
| San Diego Sports Arena
| 38–23
|- align="center" bgcolor="#ffcccc"
| 62
| March 12
| Portland
| L 108–112
|
|
|
| HemisFair Arena
| 38–24
|- align="center" bgcolor="#ccffcc"
| 63
| March 14
| Chicago
| W 119–117
|
|
|
| HemisFair Arena
| 39–24
|- align="center" bgcolor="#ccffcc"
| 64
| March 16
| @ New York
| W 114–91
|
|
|
| Madison Square Garden
| 40–24
|- align="center" bgcolor="#ffcccc"
| 65
| March 17
| @ New Jersey
| L 90–93
|
|
|
| Brendan Byrne Arena
| 40–25
|- align="center" bgcolor="#ffcccc"
| 66
| March 19
| @ Boston
| L 110–134
|
|
|
| Boston Garden
| 40–26
|- align="center" bgcolor="#ccffcc"
| 67
| March 20
| @ Cleveland
| W 115–102
|
|
|
| Richfield Coliseum
| 41–26
|- align="center" bgcolor="#ccffcc"
| 68
| March 23
| San Diego
| W 106–98
|
|
|
| HemisFair Arena
| 42–26
|- align="center" bgcolor="#ffcccc"
| 69
| March 24
| @ Denver
| L 115–129
|
|
|
| McNichols Sports Arena
| 42–27
|- align="center" bgcolor="#ccffcc"
| 70
| March 26
| Los Angeles
| W 110–105
|
|
|
| HemisFair Arena
| 43–27
|- align="center" bgcolor="#ccffcc"
| 71
| March 27
| @ Utah
| W 114–110
|
|
|
| Salt Palace Acord Arena
| 44–27
|- align="center" bgcolor="#ffcccc"
| 72
| March 30
| Golden State
| L 107–113
|
|
|
| HemisFair Arena
| 44–28

|- align="center" bgcolor="#ffcccc"
| 73
| April 1
| @ Portland
| L 105–109
|
|
|
| Memorial Coliseum
| 44–29
|- align="center" bgcolor="#ffcccc"
| 74
| April 2
| @ Seattle
| L 86–111
|
|
|
| Kingdome
| 44–30
|- align="center" bgcolor="#ffcccc"
| 75
| April 4
| Houston
| L 93–95
|
|
|
| HemisFair Arena
| 44–31
|- align="center" bgcolor="#ccffcc"
| 76
| April 7
| Kansas City
| W 118–113
|
|
|
| HemisFair Arena
| 45–31
|- align="center" bgcolor="#ffcccc"
| 77
| April 10
| @ Houston
| L 100–105
|
|
|
| The Summit
| 45–32
|- align="center" bgcolor="#ccffcc"
| 78
| April 11
| @ Kansas City
| W 126–121
|
|
|
| Kemper Arena
| 46–32
|- align="center" bgcolor="#ccffcc"
| 79
| April 13
| Denver
| W 144–137
|
|
|
| HemisFair Arena
| 47–32
|- align="center" bgcolor="#ffcccc"
| 80
| April 14
| @ Phoenix
| L 92–104
|
|
|
| Arizona Veterans Memorial Coliseum
| 47–33
|- align="center" bgcolor="#ccffcc"
| 81
| April 16
| @ Dallas
| W 118–106
|
|
|
| Reunion Arena
| 48–33
|- align="center" bgcolor="#ffcccc"
| 82
| April 18
| Utah
| L 120–128
|
|
|
| HemisFair Arena
| 48–34

Playoffs

|- align="center" bgcolor="#ccffcc"
| 1
| April 27
| @ Seattle
| W 95–93
| George Gervin (31)
| Mike Mitchell (11)
| Johnny Moore (8)
| Kingdome14,457
| 1–0
|- align="center" bgcolor="#ffcccc"
| 2
| April 28
| @ Seattle
| L 99–114
| George Gervin (24)
| Johnson, Corzine (8)
| Johnny Moore (14)
| Kingdome19,403
| 1–1
|- align="center" bgcolor="#ccffcc"
| 3
| April 30
| Seattle
| W 99–97
| George Gervin (36)
| Mike Mitchell (12)
| Johnny Moore (12)
| HemisFair Arena14,019
| 2–1
|- align="center" bgcolor="#ccffcc"
| 4
| May 2
| Seattle
| W 115–113
| Mike Mitchell (22)
| Olberding, Banks (9)
| Mike Bratz (10)
| HemisFair Arena15,002
| 3–1
|- align="center" bgcolor="#ccffcc"
| 5
| May 5
| @ Seattle
| W 109–103
| George Gervin (26)
| Dave Corzine (11)
| Moore, Bratz (9)
| Kingdome23,180
| 4–1
|-

|- align="center" bgcolor="#ffcccc"
| 1
| May 9
| @ Los Angeles
| L 117–128
| George Gervin (34)
| Dave Corzine (11)
| Johnny Moore (12)
| The Forum15,700
| 0–1
|- align="center" bgcolor="#ffcccc"
| 2
| May 11
| @ Los Angeles
| L 101–110
| Mike Mitchell (34)
| Dave Corzine (13)
| Johnny Moore (11)
| The Forum17,505
| 0–2
|- align="center" bgcolor="#ffcccc"
| 3
| May 14
| Los Angeles
| L 108–118
| George Gervin (39)
| George Gervin (15)
| Johnny Moore (12)
| HemisFair Arena15,800
| 0–3
|- align="center" bgcolor="#ffcccc"
| 4
| May 15
| Los Angeles
| L 123–128
| George Gervin (38)
| Mike Mitchell (10)
| Johnny Moore (10)
| HemisFair Arena15,800
| 0–4
|-

Player stats

Season

Playoffs

Awards and honors
George Gervin, All-NBA First Team
George Gervin, NBA Scoring Champion

Transactions

References

Spurs on Basketball Reference

San Antonio Spurs seasons
San
San Antonio Spurs
San Antonio Spurs